Stefanie Gottschlich (born 5 August 1978) is a retired German football defender. She scored three goals in 43 caps for the German national team between 1997 and 2006.

Gottschlich played for Germany at the 2000 Summer Olympics.

International goals

References

1978 births
Living people
German women's footballers
Germany women's international footballers
Footballers at the 2000 Summer Olympics
Olympic bronze medalists for Germany
People from Wolfsburg
Footballers from Lower Saxony
2003 FIFA Women's World Cup players
Olympic medalists in football
FIFA Women's World Cup-winning players
Medalists at the 2000 Summer Olympics
German footballers needing infoboxes
Olympic footballers of Germany
Women's association football defenders